Chandramani Tripathi (1 July 1946 – 23 March 2013) was an Indian politician and a member of the Bharatiya Janata Party (BJP) political party. He was elected to the 12th Lok Sabha in 1998 from  Rewa constituency in Madhya Pradesh state. He was re-elected to the 14th Lok Sabha in 2004 from the same constituency. He died in March 2013 at Medanata, Gurgaon after a short illness.

References

1946 births
India MPs 1998–1999
India MPs 2004–2009
2013 deaths
Lok Sabha members from Madhya Pradesh
People from Rewa, Madhya Pradesh
Madhya Pradesh MLAs 1977–1980
Bharatiya Janata Party politicians from Madhya Pradesh